Selenide minerals are those minerals that have the selenide anion as a main component.

Selenides are similar to sulfides and often grouped with them.

Examples include:
 achavalite 
 athabascaite 
 clausthalite 
 ferroselite 
 penroseite  
 stilleite 
 tiemannite 
 umangite

References